Nutty Putty Cave is a hydrothermal cave located west of Utah Lake in Utah County, Utah, United States. Formerly popular with cavers and known for its narrow passageways, Nutty Putty has been closed to the public since 2009 following a fatal accident that year.

Discovery and exploration

The cave, first explored in 1960 by Dale Green and friends, is currently owned by the Utah School and Institutional Trust Lands Administration, and managed by the Utah Timpanogos Grotto. The cave system was named after the soft, brown, putty-like texture of the clay found in many of its passages. Green originally thought of calling it "Silly Putty" but later decided "Nutty Putty" sounded better.  The clay-like texture is composed of silicon dioxide commonly found in sand. Because the cave was formed upward because of superheated water forming limestone, many additional minerals make up the complex structure. It contains 1,400 feet (430m) of chutes and tunnels and, prior to closure, had been accessible via a narrow surface hole. 

Before 2009, this cave had four separate rescues of cavers and Boy Scouts, who got stuck inside the cave's tight twists, turns, and crawls. In 2006, an effort was put forth to study and severely limit the number of visitors allowed inside the cave. It was estimated the cave was receiving over 5,000 visitors per year, with many visitors often entering the cave late at night and failing to take proper safety precautions. The cave’s popularity had caused excessive smoothing of the rock inside the cave to the point it was predicted a fatality would occur in one of the cave's more prominent features, a 45-degree room called "The Big Slide". On May 24, 2006, a gate was installed, and the cave was temporarily closed. In early 2009, proper management was established and an application process was developed to ensure safety precautions were being met. On May 18, 2009, the cave was reopened to the public. Utah County Undersheriff Mike Forshee explained that the concrete is not permanent and may be removed If officials decide to reopen the entrance someday.

Fatal accident and closure

On November 24, 2009, a man named John Edward Jones (January 21, 1983 – November 25, 2009) became stuck and subsequently died in the cave after being trapped inside for 28 hours. While exploring with his brother, Jones mistook a narrow tunnel for the similarly tight "Birth Canal" passageway and became stuck upside-down in an area measuring 10 by 18 inches (25 by 46 cm), around 400 feet (120 m) from the cave's entrance. Jones was held in place like a hook, unable to move without causing serious harm due to the bends his body was placed in. A large team of rescue workers came to his assistance but were unable to retrieve Jones using a sophisticated rope-and-pulley system after a pulley failed mid-extrication. Jones ultimately suffered cardiac arrest due to the strain placed upon his body over several hours by his inverted, compressed position. Rescuers concluded that it would be too dangerous to attempt to retrieve his body; the landowner and Jones' family came to an agreement that the cave would be permanently closed with the body sealed inside, as a memorial to Jones. Explosives were used to collapse the ceiling close to Jones' body, and the entrance hole was filled with concrete to prevent further access. The decision to seal off the entrance was made by the School and Institutional Trust Lands Administration, who own the property.  

The closure of the cave was opposed by some members of the spelunking community. Facebook community groups petitioned to save the cave but failed. The cave was closed prior to Jones' death, but cavers had cut their way through the gated entrance. On April 4, 2018, the plaque that was engraved to memorialize Jones was reported to have been vandalized.

A film about the tragedy titled The Last Descent, produced by James Halasima, was released on September 16, 2016. Domo CEO and Utah native Josh James financially contributed nearly $1 million to the film. Although James and Halasima are related, the donation was to support the tragic story that left an impact on many Utahns. Halasima began production in Utah but explained the focus of the film is on people and life.”There’s a lot of great people here who do a lot of great things, and I think it’s just fun to show that, and it’s not about Utah, and it’s not about Utah culture,” James said. “It’s just about people.”  

In addition to the film, John Jones brother-in-law, Dan Petersen, has organized the Nutty Putty Cycle Team and organized a Nutty Putty Bike Ride. The bike ride consisted of four members and covered 75-100 miles a day. The team was taken in at night by Latter Day Saint churches on their route and would cycle every day except Sundays. They used this time to speak with LDS youth about the fatal accident at Nutty Putty and their mission.

References

External links

 The Nutty Putty Cave official website (Now offline - archived version from archive.org) 
 Memorial Website for John Jones (Archive.org copy - Original site is now offline)
 Map of Nutty Putty Cave; Climb-Utah.com

Caves of Utah
Caving incidents and rescues
Landforms of Utah County, Utah